Diatraea ragonoti is a moth in the family Crambidae. It was described by Harold Edmund Box in 1948. It is found in Brazil.

References

Chiloini
Moths described in 1948